T. A. Rickard (1864 – 1953), formally known as Thomas Arthur Rickard was born on 29 August 1864 in Italy. Rickard's parents were British, and he became a mining engineer practising in the United States, Europe and Australia. He was also a publisher and author on mine engineering subjects.

Biography

Family and education
Thomas Arthur Rickard was born in Crotone, Italy, the son of Thomas Rickard, a Cornish mining engineer.
His grandfather was a Cornish miner, Captain James Rickard.
His cousin Tom Rickard was Mayor of Berkley, California at the time of the 1906 San Francisco earthquake and fire.
He was educated in Russia and England. In 1882 Rickard entered the Royal School of Mines, London from which he graduated in 1885.

Career
 1885 Assayer, British mining firm, Idaho Springs, Colorado
 1886 Assistant Manager, California Gold Mining Co., Colorado
 1887 Manager, Union Gold Mine, San Andreas, Calaveras County, California
 1889-1891 Consultant investigating mines in England and Australia
 1891 In charge, Silver/Lead/Gold mines, French Alps/Isere district
 1892-1893 Investigating mines in Western U.S.A.
 1894 Manager, Enterprise Mine, Colorado
 1895-1901 State Geologist, Colorado - appointed by Governor McIntyre and re-appointed by the next two governors
 1897-1898 Consultant investigating mines in Australia and Canada and other work.
 1903 Editor-in-chief, Engineering and Mining Journal, New York
 In 1903 W.E. Ford published an article in the American Journal of Science naming a new mineral Rickardite after Rickard.
 1905 purchased Mining and Scientific Press, San Francisco
 1906-1909 Editor, Mining and Scientific Press, San Francisco
 1909-1915 Founding Editor, Mining Magazine, London
 1915-1922 Editor, Mining and Scientific Press, San Francisco
 1922-1925 contributing editor, Engineering and Mining Journal, following the amalgamation of Mining and Scientific Press with that Journal
 1925- Devoted his time to writing

Death
Rickard died in Oak Bay, British Columbia on 15 August 1953.

Memberships and Awards
 Institution of Mining and Metallurgy
 1896 elected Member
 1903-1909 Member of Council
 1932 awarded Gold Medal "in recognition of his services in the general advancement of mining engineering, with special reference to his contributions to technical and historical literature"
 1948 made Honorary Member "in recognition of his long and valued services to the mining and metallurgical profession and to the Institution"
 Canadian Institute of Mining and Metallurgy
 Member
 University of Colorado
 Honorary D.Sc.
 Royal School of Mines (Old Students’) Association
 1913 Founder
 First Honorary Secretary
 American Institute of Mining and Metallurgical Engineers (AIME)
 1935 made Honorary Member

Published works
 ‘Minerals which accompany gold and their bearing upon the richness of ore deposits’ Trans I.M.M., vol. 6, 1897-8
 ‘Cripple Creek goldfield’ Trans I.M.M., vol. 8, 1899-1900
 A guide to technical writing (1908)
 'Across the San Juan Mountains', 1907, Dewey Publishing Company, San Francisco
 ‘Standardization of English in technical literature’ Trans I.M.M., vol. 19, 1909–10
 ‘Domes of Nova Scotia’ Trans I.M.M., vol. 21, 1911–12
 ‘Persistence of ore in depth’ Trans I.M.M., vol. 24, 1914–15
 ‘The later Argonauts‘ Trans I.M.M., vol. 36, 1926-7
 ‘Copper mining in Cyprus’ Trans I.M.M., vol. 39, 1929–30
 ‘Gold and silver as money metal’ Trans I.M.M., vol. 41, 1931-32
 Man and Metals (1932)
 A History of American Mining. New York & London: McGraw-Hill (1932)
 ‘The primitive smelting of copper and bronze’ Trans I.M.M., vol. 44, 1934–35
 ‘The primitive use of gold’ Trans I.M.M., vol. 44, 1934–35
 Retrospect (1937) - his autobiography
 "Indian Participation in the Gold Discoveries." British Columbia Historical Quarterly 2:1 (1938): 3-18
 The Romance of Mining. Toronto: Macmillan (1944)
 Historic Backgrounds of British Columbia. Vancouver: Wrigley Printing (1948)
 Autumn Leaves. Vancouver: Wrigley Printing (1948)

References

1864 births
1953 deaths
Mining engineers
People from Crotone